The Hughes Water Tower is located on Church Street in Hughes, Arkansas.  It is a metal structure consisting of four legs, sloping inward as they rise, which support a roughly cylindrical tower with bowl-shaped bottom and a conical roof.  The legs are joined by reinforcing rods to provide stability.  A large metal pipe connects the tank to water facilities on the ground, and there is a walkway with railing around the tank.  The tower was built in 1936 by the Chicago Bridge and Iron Works Company with funding from the Public Works Administration.

The tower was listed on the National Register of Historic Places in 2006.

See also
National Register of Historic Places listings in St. Francis County, Arkansas

References

Water towers on the National Register of Historic Places in Arkansas
Infrastructure completed in 1936
National Register of Historic Places in St. Francis County, Arkansas
1936 establishments in Arkansas
Works Progress Administration in Arkansas